Aurín is a locality located in the municipality of Sabiñánigo, in Huesca province, Aragon, Spain. As of 2020, it has a population of 39.

Geography 
Aurín is located 50km north of Huesca.

References

Populated places in the Province of Huesca